Christoph Fildebrandt (born 27 May 1989) is a German swimmer. He won a silver and a bronze medal in freestyle relays at the European and world short-course championships in 2010 and 2012, respectively. At the 2012 Summer Olympics, his team finished sixth in the 4 × 100 m freestyle relay. At the 2016 Summer Olympics in Rio de Janeiro, he competed in the 200 m freestyle where he finished 28th in the heats and did not qualify for the semifinals. He also competed as part of the 4 x 200 freestyle relay team which finished in 6th place.

References

External links
 
 
 
 
 
 

German male swimmers
Swimmers at the 2012 Summer Olympics
Swimmers at the 2016 Summer Olympics
Olympic swimmers of Germany
1989 births
Living people
Sportspeople from Wuppertal
Medalists at the FINA World Swimming Championships (25 m)
Swimmers at the 2020 Summer Olympics
20th-century German people
21st-century German people